Pinoy Idol is a 2008 Philippine television interactive reality-based singing competition show broadcast by GMA Network. Created and developed by FremantleMedia and 19 Entertainment, the program is a franchise of Pop Idol created by British entertainment executive Simon Fuller, the show is the second incarnation of Philippine Idol.

Hosted by Raymond Gutierrez, with Ogie Alcasid (singer, songwriter, and record producer), Jolina Magdangal (singer and actress), and Wyngard Tracy (retired talent manager) as judges, it premiered on April 4, 2008, replacing Kakasa Ka Ba Sa Grade 5?. The show concluded on August 17, 2008, with a total of 37 episodes.

Transition from Philippine Idol
ABC 5 had previously announced that they are considering producing a second season of the show. However, many reports claim that ABC management was slowly abandoning that plan. Sources claimed that ABC incurred heavy losses in the previous season, primarily because of the low number of advertisement slots despite being a widely followed show.  ABC asserted that it was still under negotiation with FremantleMedia about the second season and had earmarked Asian Idol as its "big launch", although there was a possibility that GMA was negotiating about Idol as well since the network already had local versions of Celebrity Duets and Are You Smarter Than A 5th Grader?—both FremantleMedia franchises.

After several negotiations, FremantleMedia had officially decided to move and to have the second season aired on GMA Network, which premiered on April 5, 2008. FremantleMedia's representative Geraldine Bravo said that it is "very fortunate" to find a new partner, while GMA Network's Senior Vice President for Entertainment Wilma Galvante added that both parties have agreed that the network "has the experience, the resources, and the people to mount talent-search programs".

Overview

Auditions
Auditions for Pinoy Idol were held in the following cities: Cagayan de Oro, Batangas City, Iloilo City, Cebu City, Davao City, Pasay, Dagupan, and Angeles City. Auditions in Naga were canceled for unknown reasons. During the Pasay auditions, Ida Henares, head of the GMA Artist Center (the talent arm of GMA Network), took over Magdangal's seat in the judges' panel as the latter was in the United States at the time. Out of thousands of aspirants, 179 passed through the next round of eliminations.

Theater rounds
The 179 audition passers gathered in Manila for the theater rounds in Cinema 6 of SM City North EDSA. The first round saw the hopefuls divided into groups of 10 and they each performed their pieces in front of the judges. Ninety contestants were chosen for the second round. In the second round, the ninety aspirants formed pairs and each pair had duets to perform together; they were judged separately. Half of the ninety were virtually cut. The final forty-five each performed a song of their choice for a final time in front of the judges. Afterwards, they were divided into three groups of fifteen. One group was eliminated, bringing the number down to thirty.

In April 2008, the judges re-examined the performances of the final thirty survivors, starting from their audition pieces down to their final ones in the theater round. Then, in the GMA Network Center, the judges announced the fates of the thirty. It is from this final group that the Top 24 were chosen.

The 2008 Beijing Olympics song "Ready to Fly" by Amy Pearson was used extensively throughout the audition and theatre phases of the competition.

Semi-finalists
[[File:Pinoy idol top 24.jpg|thumb|right|300px|Pinoy Idols 24 semifinalists.]]
The 24 semi-finalists were announced on May 17, 2008. Some of their names were changed or shortened so it would be easier for viewers to remember. Their names and short biographies were also published the day after the announcement.  The semifinals, or "workshop phase," began on May 23, 2008, with the Top 12 male contestants performing first and the Top 12 female contestants performing the next day.  Eliminations were on a weekly basis beginning May 25, 2008, until the Top 12 was finalized. Because of a quirk in the number of weeks and process of elimination, this stage ended a week later than expected (see Production below).

Male semi-finalistsJoselindo Pimpino Jr., also known as JJ Jr., is 17 from Bataan. He currently studies in Baguio where his parents live. He also claims to be Pinoy Pop Superstar's youngest competitor at age 14. He auditioned in Dagupan.
 "You to Me Are Everything" (The Real Thing)
 "King of Wishful Thinking" (Go West)
 "Signed, Sealed, Delivered I'm Yours" (Stevie Wonder)
 "When I Need You" (Leo Sayer) - Eliminated, June 15, 2008Walton Zerrudo is 25 from Laguna. He considers standards as his forte and describes his son as his inspiration. He auditioned in Pasay.
 "She's out of My Life" (Michael Jackson)
 "Every Breath You Take" (The Police)
 "Hello" (Lionel Richie) - Eliminated, June 8, 2008Ryan "Rye" Estrada is 28 from Iloilo. He is a band vocalist and a self-confessed Robbie Williams fan. During the theater rounds, his third performance piece was dedicated to his mother. He auditioned in Iloilo.
 "Your Love" (Alamid)
 "Babe" (Styx) - Eliminated, June 1, 2008Sherwin Bayangan, who goes under the name of Sherwin Marquez, is 26 from Dagupan. He currently lives with his parents in Tuguegarao. He auditioned in Dagupan.
 "How Do You Heal a Broken Heart" (Chris Walker)
 "The Old Songs" (Barry Manilow) - Eliminated, June 1, 2008Paulo Dio Maghari, also known as Dio Paolo, is 24 from Bacolod. He is a call center agent and a son of a receptionist. He has sung in concerts and has even acted in a musical. He auditioned in Iloilo.
 "Angels Brought Me Here" (Guy Sebastian) - Eliminated, May 25, 2008Eleuterio "Elliot" Andal is 24 from Batangas. A son of a jeepney driver, he worked as a choral trainer and conductor and has won plums in several choral competitions. He was also a contestant on Pinoy Pop Superstar. He auditioned in Batangas.
 "Sana Ay Ikaw na Nga" (Basil Valdez) - Eliminated, May 25, 2008

Female semi-finalistsCarol (Anne) Leus is 17 from Batangas, currently studying in the College of St. Benilde. In 2004, she joined and topped the Pop Star Search in Dubai, organized by The Filipino Channel. She auditioned in Pasay.
 "I Believe In You and Me" (Whitney Houston)
 "It Must Have Been Love" (Roxette)
 "The Voice Within" (Christina Aguilera)
 "I Turn to You" (Christina Aguilera) - Eliminated, June 15, 2008Meryl (Consulta) David is 23 from the Bicol Region. She is the daughter of a former singer and a real estate broker whose achievement is finishing her course in nursing while singing in a band. She auditioned in Angeles.
 "You Mean The World To Me" (Toni Braxton)
 "I Feel for You" (Chaka Khan)
 "Killing Me Softly with His Song" (Roberta Flack) - Eliminated, June 8, 2008Regene Ong is 20 from Quezon City. She impressed the judges by singing a wide range of songs, and is equally known for her self-made vintage dresses. She auditioned in Pasay.
 "Fever" (Elvis Presley)
 "With Or Without You" (U2) - Eliminated, June 1, 2008Vrenilyn "Vren" Villaflor is 17 from Quezon City. A daughter of a police officer, she joined several singing tilts as a child, including Ang Batang Kampeon and Tuklas Talino. She auditioned in Pasay.
 "Fame" (Irene Cara)
 "Wind Beneath My Wings" (Bette Midler) - Eliminated, June 1, 2008Beverly "Bev" Ejercito is 18 from Davao. She is a daughter of a company driver and is proud of graduating from high school and winning pageants. She also matches her big hair with her big voice. She auditioned in Pasay.
 "Crazy" (Patsy Cline) - Eliminated, May 25, 2008Drizzle (Emerald) Muñiz is 28 from Quezon City. She is a professional songwriter who penned one of Sarah Geronimo's songs from the latter's album. She auditioned in Pasay.
 "My Immortal" (Evanescence) - Eliminated, May 25, 2008

Semifinals weekly song themes

 Week 1 (May 23 & 24): Own choice of songs
 Week 2 (May 30 & 31): Hit songs from year of birth
 Week 3 (June 6 & 7): Greatest musical influences
 Week 4 (June 13 & 14): Songs for fathers

Top 12 finalists
After the eliminating the eleventh and twelfth semi-finalists from the competition, the Final 12 was formally announced on June 15, 2008. The finals, or "gala night" stage, started on June 21, 2008, with eliminations the next night. Like the semi-finals, eliminations during the finals are on a weekly basis for the first seven weeks.

In the eighth week, two finalists were cut from the competition in a single night to accommodate the final three finalists for the finale; that elimination took place on August 10, 2008. The finale shows took place on August 16 and August 17, 2008, at the SMX Convention Center.Gretchen (Stephanie) Espina is 20 from Biliran. She is the daughter of Rogelio J. Espina, the governor of the said province. She is studying in the University of the Philippines, Diliman where she is a member of the internationally acclaimed University of the Philippines Singing Ambassadors (UPSA). During the competition, she was never in the bottom group. She auditioned in Pasay accompanied by a bodyguard.

 "Neither One Of Us (Wants To Be The First To Say Good-bye)" (Gladys Knight & The Pips)
 "The Way You Make Me Feel" (Michael Jackson)
 "Wala Na Bang Pag-ibig?" (Jaya)
 "Try It On My Own" (Whitney Houston)
 "Respect" (Aretha Franklin)
 "A House Is Not a Home" (Dionne Warwick)
 "Follow Your Road" (Pauline Wilson)
 "Kung Maibabalik Ko Lang" (Regine Velasquez)
 "You Lift Me Up" (Jaya)
 "Ikaw Lang Ang Aking Mahal" (Brownman Revival)
 "Gaano Kadalas Ang Minsan" (Basil Valdez)
 "I'm Here" (Fantasia Barrino)
 "For Your Eyes Only" (Sheena Easton; Jolina Magdangal's choice) - Winner, August 17, 2008
 "Stand Up for Love" (Destiny's Child; Jaya's choice) - Winner, August 17, 2008
 "Ngayon" (Basil Valdez; personal choice) - Winner, August 17, 2008
 "To You" (winner's performance song) - Winner, August 17, 2008Jay Ann "Jayann" Bautista is 21 from Pampanga. She studies in the University of the Philippines, Diliman and her parents run their own businesses. She was formerly a talent of VIVA Entertainment and had released two albums (2003: JayAnne, 2006: Call Me JayAnne) under its record label. Like Espina, she was never placed in the bottom group during the competition. She auditioned in Angeles.

 "Secret" (Heart)
 "Kiss" (Prince)
 "Bleeding Love" (Leona Lewis)
 "I Am Changing" (Jennifer Hudson)
 "(You Make Me Feel Like) A Natural Woman" (Aretha Franklin)
 "Whine Up" (Kat DeLuna)
 "Better Days" (Dianne Reeves)
 "Pangarap Ko Ang Ibigin Ka" (Regine Velasquez)
 "Laging Naroon Ka" (Jaya)
 "Akin Ka Na Lang" (Itchyworms)
 "You" (Basil Valdez)
 "Finally" (Fergie)
 "I'll Never Love This Way Again" (Dionne Warwick; Wyngard Tracy's choice) - Second place, August 17, 2008
 "You'll Never Walk Alone" - (Christine Johnson; Regine Velasquez's choice) - Second place, August 17, 2008
 "Proud Mary - (Creedence Clearwater Revival; personal choice) - Second place, August 17, 2008
 "To You" (winner's performance song) - Second place, August 17, 2008Ramon "Ram" Chaves III is 25 from Cagayan de Oro. He considers fatherhood as his most cherished accomplishment as his audition in Pasay coincided with his wife giving birth.

 "My Hero" (Foo Fighters)
 "Boys Don't Cry"  (The Cure)
 "Kung Ayaw Mo, 'Wag Mo" (Rivermaya)
 "My Sacrifice" (Creed)
 "With Arms Wide Open" (Creed)
 "Banal na Aso, Santong Kabayo" (Yano)
 "Yugyugan Na" (P. O. T.)
 "Tuwing Umuulan At Kapiling Ka" (Regine Velasquez; originally by Basil Valdez)
 "Honesty" (Jaya; originally by Billy Joel)
 "Sandalan" (6 Cycle Mind)
 "Ngayon at Kailanman" (Basil Valdez)
 "Bahay Yugyugan" (Francis Magalona)
 "Bridge Over Troubled Water" (Simon & Garfunkel; Ogie Alcasid's choice) - Third place, August 17, 2008
 "I Don't Want to Miss a Thing" (Aerosmith; Jaya's choice) - Third place, August 17, 2008
 "Handog" (Florante; personal choice) - Third place, August 17, 2008Daryl (Jett) Celis is 21 from Rizal. He is a son of an OFW, a bar owner in Japan. He auditioned in Pasay with his grandmother, whom he calls his lucky charm.

 "Still with You" (Eric Benét)
 "True Colors" (Cyndi Lauper)
 "Because of You" (Ne-Yo)
 "Right Here Waiting" (Richard Marx)
 "Superstar" (Delaney, Bonnie & Friends)
 "Basta't Kasama Kita" (Dingdong Avanzado)
 "Kung Kailangan Mo Ako" (Rey Valera)
 "Sa Piling Mo" (Regine Velasquez and Ogie Alcasid)
 "Ikaw Lamang" (Jaya)
 "Nasaan Ka" (Pupil)
 "Hanggang Sa Dulo Ng Walang Hanggan" (Basil Valdez)
 "The Promise" (Martin Nievera) - Eliminated, August 10, 2008Elizalde "Kid" Camaya is 24 from Pampanga, as iterated by the program. He currently works for a BPI branch in Quezon City, to which his introductory profile refers as his residence. He says that the show is his "dream and passion." He auditioned in Pasay.

 "A Song for You" (Andy Williams)
 "(There's) Always Something There to Remind Me" (Naked Eyes)
 "Love Always Finds A Way" (Peabo Bryson)
 "Gone Too Soon" (Michael Jackson)
 "Ordinary People" (John Legend)
 "I'll Never Love This Way Again" (Dionne Warwick)
 "The Warrior Is A Child" (Gary Valenciano)
 "Narito Ako" (Regine Velasquez)
 "Kung Wala Na" (Jaya)
 "Stay" (Cueshé)
 "Paano Ba Ang Mangarap" (Basil Valdez)
 "Careless Whisper" (George Michael) - Eliminated, August 10, 2008Warren Antig is 25 from Baguio. He also goes under the nickname of "Bordado" because of his tattoos. He became notorious for his decision to back out of the competition during the Theater rounds, only to change his mind in the last minute, irking judges Alcasid and Magdangal in the process and causing delays in the taping of those rounds. He auditioned in Dagupan.

 "Ulitin" (P. O. T.)
 "Open Arms" (Journey)
 "Billie Jean" (Michael Jackson)
 "Panaginip" (P. O. T.)
 "Shout" (Tears For Fears)
 "You Give Love a Bad Name" (Bon Jovi)
 "Balong Malalim" (Juan dela Cruz Band)
 "Urong Sulong" (Regine Velasquez)
 "Cool Change" (Jaya; originally by Little River Band)
 "Kahit Kailan" (South Border)
 "Kung Ako'y Iiwan Mo" (Basil Valdez) - Eliminated, August 3, 2008Penelope Ann Matanguihan, known only as Penelope in the show, is 16 from Batangas. She is perennial singing champion who is "raring to fight for her family." She auditioned in Batangas.

 "Wild Horses" (Natasha Bedingfield)
 "(Everything I Do) I Do It for You" (Bryan Adams)
 "One Step at a Time" (Jordin Sparks)
 "Papa, Can You Hear Me?" (Barbra Streisand)
 "Alone" (Heart)
 "So Sick" (Ne-Yo)
 "This Is My Now" (Jordin Sparks)
 "What Kind of Fool Am I?" (Regine Velasquez; originally by Anthony Newley)
 "Beauty and Madness" (Jaya; originally by Fra Lippo Lippi)
 "Weak" (Freestyle) - Eliminated, July 27, 2008Kristoffer Rei Tragico, or Toffer Rei in the show, is 23 from Marikina. He is the son of a driver and a housewife. Despite being from Luzon, he auditioned in Iloilo.

 "Stigmatized" (The Calling)
 "I Want to Break Free" (Queen)
 "Something to Say" (Harem Scarem)
 "I Could Not Ask for More" (Edwin McCain)
 "Honestly" (Harem Scarem)
 "Changes In My Life" (Mark Sherman)
 "It's My Life" (Bon Jovi)
 "You Made Me Stronger" (Regine Velasquez)
 "Sometimes You Just Know" (Jaya) - Eliminated, July 20, 2008Sue Ellen Cubing, known only as Sue Ellen, is 16 from Iloilo. She is a daughter of a pastor and beauty pageant runner-up. She and her sister, Genevieve, auditioned together in Iloilo and made it through the theater rounds, where Genevieve was among those eliminated.

 "Love Thang" (Michelle Williams)
 "More Than Words" (Extreme)
 "Love Like This" (Natasha Bedingfield)
 "Thank You" (Dido)
 "Survivor" (Destiny's Child)
 "In the End" (Linkin Park)
 "Jesus Take the Wheel" (Carrie Underwood)
 "Dadalhin" (Regine Velasquez) - Eliminated, July 13, 2008Roberto "Robby" Navarro, Jr. is 28 from Pampanga. He was once part of a singing group called the Wise Guys, but made a difficult decision to go solo, which he claims is paying off. He released an eponymous solo album way back in 1999 under Sony BMG. He auditioned in Angeles.

 "Whenever, Wherever, Whatever" (Maxwell)
 "What You Won't Do for Love" (Bobby Caldwell)
 "Wildflower" (Color Me Badd)
 "If Tomorrow Never Comes" (Garth Brooks)
 "One Last Cry" (Brian McKnight)
 "Someone That I Used To Love" (Natalie Cole)
 "Greatest Love of All" (Whitney Houston) - Eliminated, July 6, 2008(Angeli) Mae Flores is 18 from Marikina. She competed in the talent show Star for a Night, the same one in which Sarah Geronimo and Mau Marcelo participated. She auditioned in Angeles.

 "Love Will Show You Everything" (Jennifer Love Hewitt)
 "Listen To Your Heart" (Roxette)
 "Walk Away" (Kelly Clarkson)
 "Angels" (Robbie Williams)
 "You Oughta Know" (Alanis Morissette)
 "If I Didn't Love You" (Tina Arena) - Eliminated, June 29, 2008Jenifer "Jeni" Rawolle is 20 from Paco, Manila. She previously competed in Pinoy Pop Superstar. She auditioned in Pasay.

 "For Once in My Life" (Vonda Shepard)
 "Lean On Me" (Club Nouveau)
 "Too Darn Hot" (Ella Fitzgerald)
 "You Raise Me Up" (Secret Garden)
 "Inseparable" (Natalie Cole) - Eliminated, June 22, 2008

Finals weekly song themes
 Week 1 (June 21): Songs from their greatest pre-Idol performances
 Week 2 (June 28): Song dedications
 Week 3 (July 5): Songs of their lives
 Week 4 (July 12): Songs sung by Regine Velasquez
 Week 5 (July 19): Songs sung by Jaya
 Week 6 (July 26): Songs by OPM bands
 Week 7 (August 2): Songs sung by Basil Valdez
 Week 8 (August 9): Greatest Idol performances
 Week 9 (August 16): Judges' choice, favorite mentor's choice, and personal choice

Special guests
The following have become mentors for the finalists. The mentors in Weeks 4, 5, and 7 also supplanted the jury as a special guest judge, while in Week 6, several of the members, if not all members, of each mentor band appeared on stage to oversee the performance of the apprentice finalist.
 Week 4: Regine Velasquez
 Week 5: Jaya
 Week 6 (in order of performance of song): 6 Cycle Mind, Itchyworms, Pupil, Brownman Revival, Cueshé, South Border and Freestyle
 Week 7: Basil Valdez

Finale
Pinoy Idol held its Performance Night Finale on August 17, 2008, at the SMX Convention Center at the SM Mall of Asia in Pasay. Each of the three remaining contenders performed three songs, one personally chosen by the contestant, one by one of the judges and one by the contestant's favorite mentor. Gutierrez hosted most of the program while joining him in the sidelines were Rhian Ramos and Karylle. Each song was performed with Tan's band and the group The Opera as back-up singers, just as always. They were also joined in each of two joint performances by Basil Valdez and Regine Velasquez. The bands Freestyle, South Border, Cueshé, and Itchyworms also have performances of their own.

In an unusual instance, the judges held off their comments for each of the finalists' performances until after the last performance of the last finalist. Each of the three judges told one of the three finalists about his comments on the performances as well as those of the other judges.

The next night at the same venue, the star-studded results show was held, headlined by Bautista, Chaves, and Espina together with the rest of the Top 24, performing together with Hajji Alejandro, Jett Pangan, Luke Mejares, Verne Varga, and Duncan Ramos. The third placer was immediately announced soon after with Chaves shut out of the final two, leaving Bautista and Espina in the running for the title.

There were also performances by the bands Pupil, Callalily, and Rivermaya.

For their final performance before the announcement of the winner, Bautista and Espina each performed an original composition "To You" by resident judge Alcasid and with the University of the Philippines Concert Chorus as back-up choir.

Espina was voted as the first Pinoy Idol, although no figures were announced for all three finalists.  Aside from the title, Espina  received P1 million, a condominium unit, a brand new car, a recording contract with Sony BMG Music Philippines, and a television contract with GMA Network.

To date, Valdez and Cueshé were the only acts so far that have performances in both Philippine Idol grand finals shows. They, Alejandro and Mejares were also the only ones to appear in both Philippine Idol shows per se as Alejandro and Mejares appeared as guest judges in Philippine Idol.

Elimination chart

Reception
Ratings
According to AGB Nielsen Philippines' Mega Manila household television ratings, the pilot episode of Pinoy Idol earned a 16.3% rating. While the final episode scored a 18% rating.

Critical response
Early into the development of Pinoy Idol, a firestrom grew on online platforms requesting for Ignacio's exclusion as its program director primarily because of his frequent use of butterflies (whether live butterflies or having people wear butterfly wings) on every project he has directed with critics finding the idea "tacky and definitely not Idol-material".  He commented that he would still stick to his "lucky trademark" and even taunted petitioners to direct the show and put beetles or mosquitoes on the set if that is what they want - a statement which only added to the collective anger of fans. However, no butterfly-inspired designs were used in the program.Part of "Mga kumukutya noon kay Marian Rivera, ‘nagdurusa’ ngayon" Journal Online, October 22, 2007 

In an article published before Pinoy Idol'''s premiere, noted film and television critic Nestor U. Torre hoped that the lapses that occurred in Philippine Idol would be remedied in Pinoy Idol. However, once the show went underway, those hopes seem to dampen as Torre noted on the first episode alone some mediocre talent and Gutierrez not yet becoming his own as host. Torre did laud the judging styles of Alcasid and Magdangal and Tracy's emerging Simon Cowell-like demeanor. One viewer, who wrote to the Philippine Daily Inquirer about the show, was not as impressed when comparing it to Philippine Idol, complaining about Gutierrez's nasal and unnatural hosting style, Magdangal's immaturity as judge and Tracy seemingly imitating Cowell more as compared to Cayabyab.

A number of critics expressed that, counting out the production lapses, a main reason for the show's failure is that early elimination of the better contestants which confused many of its viewers.

Meanwhile, entertainment writer Jean Oli wrote that Pinoy Idol does not have that "Idol feel" despite high expectations towards GMA Network, calling it "an ordinary singing contest."  She even stated that the network's previous singing contests such as Pinoy Pop Superstar and Celebrity Duets:  Philippine Edition were more interesting to watch than Pinoy Idol.

In a post-mortem article written six days after the finale, Torre wrote that the entire Finals phase of the competition came out less exciting than Philippine Idols because of several factors, namely some of the finalists were not even star-material, the entire audition process that put them in the competition in the process, and the early elimination of the better singers from the competition. He even doubts if the winners and others in the competition were really talented and versatile enough to take advantage of the strong support that they had during the competition.

Cancellation
GMA Network was initially deciding on whether to produce a second season of Pinoy Idol.  GMA's Senior Vice President for Entertainment Wilma Galvante said that GMA and Fremantle were accessing "learnings" from the first season, such as the text-voting mechanisms, which she said is "different for the Philippines." Eventually, GMA reportedly decided not to renew the franchise for 2009, and instead released details on another new singing competition, Are You the Next Big Star?'' Meanwhile, the Associated Broadcasting Company is reportedly prepared to take over the franchise if necessary, though GMA Network still has the option to renew it.

References

External links

2008 Philippine television series debuts
2008 Philippine television series endings
Filipino-language television shows
GMA Network original programming
Idols (franchise)
Philippine reality television series
Philippine television series based on British television series
Television series by Fremantle (company)